is a Japanese former pianist under the Giza Studio label.

Biography
Haneda started playing the piano at age 4 and graduated from the Osaka College of Music. In 2007 she performed in the September 2007 memorial concert for Izumi Sakai of Zard. In 2008 she released her first album Kokoro wo Hiraite: Zard Piano Classics.  The last update on her personal blog was posted on December 2012. Since then her activities have resumed.

Discography
During her career, she has released one independent album, four studio albums, and one best-of album.

Independent Releases

Studio Releases

References

External links
Official blog
Official Myspace

1981 births
21st-century Japanese pianists
Being Inc. artists
Japanese pianists
Japanese women pianists
Living people
21st-century Japanese women musicians
Osaka College of Music alumni
21st-century women pianists